Snuff is a 1976 splatter film directed by Michael Findlay and Horacio Fredriksson. Originally an exploitation film loosely based on the 1969 murders committed by the Manson Family, it is most notorious for being falsely marketed as if it were an actual snuff film. The controversy about the film was deliberately manufactured to attract publicity: it prompted an investigation by the New York County District Attorney, who determined that the murder shown in the film was fake. This picture contributed to the urban legend of snuff films, although the concept did not originate with it.

Plot

Actress Terry London (played by Mirta Massa) and her producer, Max Marsh, visit an unnamed country in South America. A female biker cult led by a man named Satán stalks and eventually murders the pregnant London and her circle of friends. 

In the film's last minutes, the action is interrupted as the camera pulls out to show the crew shooting the scene: the director is then seen flirting with a female crew member. They start kissing, with the crew filming them. The director suddenly assaults the woman, and proceeds to torture, kill and disembowel her as the crew assists him and keeps filming. The film then ends with the camera running out of stock.

Cast
 Margarita Amuchástegui as Angelica
 Ana Carro as Ana
 Liliana Fernández Blanco as Susanna
 Roberta Findlay as Carmela (voice)
  as Horst's father
 Enrique Larratelli as Satán
 Mirta Massa as Terry London
  as Max Marsh
 Clao Villanueva as Horst Frank
 Michael Findlay as Detective 
 Brian Cary as film director (additional footage)
 Tina Austin as script girl (additional footage)

Production
The film started out as a low-budget exploitation film titled Slaughter made by the husband-and-wife grindhouse filmmaking team of Michael and Roberta Findlay. Filmed in Argentina in 1971 on a budget of $30,000, it depicted the actions of a Manson-esque murder cult, and was shot mainly without sound due to the actors understanding very little English. The film's financier, Jack Bravman, took an out-of-court settlement from American International Pictures to allow it to use the title Slaughter for its Blaxploitation film starring Jim Brown. Some sources state that the Findlays' film received an extremely limited theatrical release, while others indicate it was never screened theatrically at all under its original title. 

In any event, independent low-budget distributor and sometime producer Allan Shackleton, who specialized in sexploitation movies, bought the world distribution rights for the film. He eventually saw no potential in the picture and shelved it. In 1975, seeking to recoup his investment in that film, Shackleton was inspired to release it with a new ending after reading a newspaper article on the rumor of snuff films produced in South America, and deciding to cash in on the urban legend. Shackleton started advertising the film in December 1975 through several press releases, before the new footage had even been shot. When Michael Findlay realized that it was his own film being promoted under the new title Snuff, he tried to renegociate his contract with the distributor, but eventually failed to secure more money from Shackleton. The filmmaker hired to produce the additional footage was Simon Nuchtern, who directed a new ending in vérité style, in which a woman is brutally murdered and dismembered by a film crew, supposedly the crew of Slaughter.  

The new footage, shot over one day in Carter Stevens's adult film studio, was spliced onto the end of Slaughter with an abrupt cut suggesting that the footage was unplanned and the murder authentic. However, the cast and scenery in Nuchtern's ending have no resemblance with those appearing in Findlay's original footage. The publicity material implied that the film featured an actual murder, without stating it outright: Snuff was released with the tagline "The film that could only be made in South America... where Life is CHEAP!" Shackleton also removed all other credits from the film to increase the air of mystery surrounding its production.

Controversy
As a publicity stunt, Shackleton reportedly hired fake protesters to picket movie theaters showing the film. According to his associate Carter Stevens, Shackleton was surprised when some genuine protesters also started picketing the theaters. Shackleton's efforts succeeded in generating a media frenzy around the film, with media commentators and citizen groups condemning the film without having actually seen it. Although the film was exposed as a hoax in Variety shortly after its release, it became popular in New York City, Philadelphia, Los Angeles and Boston. 

The Adult Film Association of America (AFAA), of which Shackleton was a member, took pains to avoid any association with Snuff, as the snuff movies urban legend included rumors that the sex industry was involved in those films. The AFAA expelled Shackleton, announced that affiliated adult movie theaters would not show the picture (which anyway was being shown in mainstream theaters and not in adult ones), and called a press conference to insist that the film was a hoax. 

Rumors persisted that the film showed a real-life murder. Throughout Snuff'''s theatrical run, Shackleton remained purportedly ambiguous about the nature of the film. When interviewed by Variety, he stated: "[If the murder is real], I'd be a fool to admit it. If it isn't real, I'd be a fool to admit it".

Prompted by "complaints and petitions from well-known writers, including Eric Bentley and Susan Brownmiller, and legislators", New York District Attorney Robert M. Morgenthau conducted an month-long investigation into the circumstances surrounding the film's production. Morgenthau ultimately dismissed the supposedly "real" murder as "nothing more than conventional trick photography—as is evident to anyone who sees the movie".Liam T. Sanford, "Nasties News", p. 49 (Video Viewer magazine, July 1983) Morgenthau reassured the public that the actress apparently dismembered and killed in the ending of the film was "alive and well", having urged the police to trace her. He also found no basis for criminal prosecution related to pornography statutes, or to consumer fraud laws in regard to the film's advertising. However, Morgenthau stated that he had been "concerned about the fact that this kind of a film might incite or encourage people to commit violence against women".

Release
Theatrical release
Upon its release at the National Theatre in New York City with a $4 ticket price, Snuff grossed $66,456 in its first week. In New York, it outgrossed One Flew Over the Cuckoo's Nest for three consecutive weeks.

During its theatrical run, feminist groups kept protesting Snuff, which influenced city officials in Santa Clara, Philadelphia and St Paul to force theaters to stop showing the film. Twenty women protested the film's return engagement in Rochester, New York at the Holiday Ciné: four of those protesters were arrested after breaking the poster frame to destroy the film's poster. A theater owner in Monticello was prosecuted on obscenity charges. In most places, however, the protests failed to stop the theaters from showing the movie.

Home media
In the United Kingdom, the film was released on VHS by Astra Video in 1982, coinciding with the start of the video nasty controversy. The cover blurb read "The original legendary atrocity shot and banned in New York" and claimed that "The actors and actresses who dedicated their lives to making this film were never seen or heard from again". The cover also credited "T. Amazzo" (a play on the Italian phrase "Ti ammazzo", meaning "I kill you") as director. The Sunday Times published an outraged article about the film, which Astra Video eventually pulled from distribution once it had benefited from the publicity. 

The film was released on DVD by Blue Underground on July 29, 2003. Blue Underground later released the film on DVD Special edition and for the first time on Blu-ray on October 22, 2013. It was last released by Cheezy Flicks on March 13, 2018.

Critical receptionSnuff was panned by critics at the time of its original release, both for the disingenuous publicity surrounding it and for its overall quality. Richard Eder of the New York Times described it as "a horrendously written, photographed, acted, directed and dubbed bit of verdigris showing a group of devil-girls massacring people." Also in the New York Times, John Leonard reported that Marcus Welby, M.D. could have improved on the film's special effects and that the final "murder" was less "obnoxious" than a similar scene from Flesh for Frankenstein. 

Later reviews were equally negative. Joel Harley from HorrorNews.net wrote in his review of the film, "Were it not for that ending and the furore surrounding it, Snuff would surely have been forgotten a long time ago. Beyond the infamy, it's a stultifyingly average film." Bill Gibron from PopMatters gave the film 3/10 stars, writing, "Unlike modern gorefests which strive for autopsy like realism in all facets of the F/X, Snuff is cheap and cheesy. While it[s] legend lives on, its realities end any speculation or scandal for that matter. No one really dies onscreen during the last few minutes of this movie. Your sense of gullibility, on the other hand..." Adam Tyner from DVD Talk called the film "basically unwatchable in its original form". Tyner criticized the film's unnecessarily dragged out scenes, lack of tension, and dubbed dialogue, which he called "sleepy, flat, lifeless, and howlingly inept all around, never even making an attempt to match any frantically flapping lips".

Notes

References

Further reading
 Kerekes, David & Slater, David (1994). Killing For Culture. Creation Books.  
 Johnson, Eithne & Schaefer, Eric. "Soft Core/Hard Gore: Snuff as a Crisis in Meaning," in Journal of Film and Video'', University of Illinois Press, (Volume 45, Numbers 2-3, Summer-Fall, 1993): pages 40–59.

External links
 
 
 
 Snuff Boxing: Revisiting the Snuff Coda (The University of British Columbia's Film Journal) - showing the mutilation scene at the end of the film

1976 films
1976 horror films
1970s exploitation films
Films shot in Argentina
Cultural depictions of Charles Manson
Obscenity controversies in film
Films about snuff films
American splatter films
1970s serial killer films
1970s English-language films
1970s American films
False advertising
Film controversies in the United States